Abu Amir (ابو امیر) is a village in south-western Yemen. It is located in the Abyan Governorate on a wadi to the northeast of Jaar.

References

External links
Towns and villages in the Abyan Governorate

Populated places in Abyan Governorate
Villages in Yemen